Craig Edward Savill (born October 25, 1978) is a Canadian curler, originally from Manotick, Ontario, Canada. He currently plays third on Team Adam Casey. He also coaches the Czech men's national team.

Career
Savill's father was stationed at CFB Lahr in Germany, and Savill was born there. However, Savill grew up and still lives in Ottawa. He curls out of the Ottawa Curling Club in club play. 
Before playing with Howard, Savill won two Canadian Junior Curling Championships and two World Junior Curling Championships (1998, 1999) as John Morris's third. In 2001 he moved to the position of second, still with John Morris. The team went to the 2002 Nokia Brier, and lost in the final to Alberta, skipped by Randy Ferbey. A couple of years later, Morris moved to Alberta and Savill joined Howard's team. With Howard, Savill, second Brent Laing and third Richard Hart lost in the 2006 Tim Hortons Brier to Quebec skipped by fellow Ottawa Curling Club member Jean-Michel Ménard. The following year, at the 2007 Tim Hortons Brier they would finally be victorious defeating 2006 Olympic Gold Medalist Brad Gushue in the Brier final. They then went on to win the 2007 Ford World Men's Curling Championship, defeating Germany in the final.

Personal life
Savill is a financial advisor with Sun Life financial. He is married to Karen Cumberland and has two children. He was diagnosed with Hodgkin's lymphoma in late 2015, and as a result, he was forced to take a hiatus from curling. As a special tribute, Savill was allowed to throw two rocks in a game for former teammate Glenn Howard's Ontario rink at the 2016 Tim Hortons Brier in his hometown of Ottawa. He would make both shots perfectly.

He currently lives in Kensington, Prince Edward Island.

Teams

Notes

References

External links
 

1978 births
Living people
Curlers from Ottawa
World curling champions
Brier champions
Canadian male curlers
Canadian curling coaches
Canada Cup (curling) participants
Curlers from Prince Edward Island
People from Prince County, Prince Edward Island
21st-century Canadian people